Some Hearts is the 2005 debut album by Carrie Underwood.

Some Hearts may also refer to:

 Some Hearts (The Everly Brothers album), 1988
 "Some Hearts" (song), a 1989 song written by Diane Warren, recorded by Marshall Crenshaw and Carrie Underwood
 "Some Hearts", a 1988 song by The Everly Brothers from their album Some Hearts
 "Some Hearts", a 2015 single by David James